Monroe Leigh (1919–2001) was a prominent American political philosopher and diplomat. He was born in Halifax, Virginia, in 1919. He graduated from Hampden-Sydney College in 1940 and earned a law degree from the University of Virginia, serving  as editor of the Virginia Law Review. His time in law school was interrupted by service in the Army Air Forces during World War II.

He served as a legal adviser for the United States Defense Department  and was picked by Henry Kissinger to serve as Legal Adviser of the Department of State. He was also NATO mission envoy, and president of the American Society of International Law. He was a prolific writer on the subject of international law, with his influential criticism of the United States' refusal to sign the Rome Statute of the International Criminal Court being published in 2000, the year before he died.

See also
International Criminal Court
United States and the International Criminal Court

References

American political scientists
1919 births
2001 deaths
People from Halifax, Virginia
Hampden–Sydney College alumni
University of Virginia School of Law alumni
United States Army Air Forces personnel of World War II
United States Department of Defense officials
United States Department of State officials
Ford administration personnel
Presidents of the American Society of International Law
20th-century political scientists